Merinaghen (also Merinaghem or Merinaguene) is a locality in Northwest Senegal. A fort was built there in 1822 to facilitate trade along the Sénégal River, and a village survives to this day.

Further reading
 (fr) H. Bessac and P. L. Dfkeyser, « Les ruines du Fort Merinaghen en marge de la mise en valeur du Sénégal de 1817 à 1854 », Notes africaines, 1951, p. 18-21

Populated places in Saint-Louis Region
Saint-Louis Region